The Judicial and Bar Council (JBC) of the Philippines is a constitutionally-created body that recommends appointees for vacancies that may arise in the composition of the Supreme Court, other lower courts, and the Legal Education Board, and in the offices of the Ombudsman, Deputy Ombudsman and the Special Prosecutor.

History 
The Supreme Court and other lower courts in the Philippines were established upon the basis of Act No .136 of 1901 of the Philippine Commission. This succeeded the Real Audiencas and lower courts during the Spanish era. At this time, the Supreme Court was appointed by the Philippine Commission. With the approval of the Jones Law in 1916, the justices of the Supreme Court were appointed by the President of the United States, with advice and consent of the United States Senate. Judges of lower courts were then appointed by the Governor-General.

Upon the ratification of the 1935 constitution, all justices and judges are appointed by the President of the Philippines with consent of the 21-member Commission on Appointments of the National Assembly of the Philippines. Upon the reestablishment of bicameralism, the Commission on Appointments then had equal number of members (12) from the House of Representatives and Senate. This became the setup until the approval of the 1973 constitution, where the president had the sole power of appointment, with no check and balance from the Batasang Pambansa. With the approval of the 1987 constitution, the Judicial and Bar Council was created to provide a shortlist of nominees on which the president can appoint from.

Composition
The Council is composed of a representative of the Integrated Bar, a professor of law, a retired member of the Supreme Court, and a representative of the private sector. They are the "regular" members, as opposed to the Secretary of Justice and a representative of Congress who are the ex officio members. The Chief Justice of the Supreme Court is the ex officio chairman, while the Clerk of the Supreme Court shall serve as the ex officio secretary.

The regular members would be nominated by the President with the consent of the Commission on Appointments for a term of four years. However, since the terms will be staggered, the first set of members would a different lengths of service: the representative of the Integrated Bar shall serve for four years, the professor of law for three years, the retired Justice for two years, and the representative of the private sector for one year. The succeeding members shall then be given the full four-year term.

The Chief Justice is appointed by the president from the shortlist submitted by the JBC. The Secretary of Justice, as a member of the Cabinet, is appointed by the president with advice and consent of the Commission on Appointments. The member of Congress is elected by the chamber where the member came from.

The regular members were allowed to be reappointed without limit. The Secretary of Justice serves at the pleasure of the president, while the representative of Congress serves until they are recalled by their chamber, or until the term of Congress that named them expires. Finally, the Chief Justice serves until mandatory retirement at the age of 70. The regular members' terms start at July 9.

In 2012, a petition at the Supreme Court questioned on who should occupy the seat allocated for Congress. By then, there are two members of Congress in the council, with both having voting rights: the chairman of the House of Representatives Committee on Justice and the Chairman of the Senate Committee on Justice and Human Rights. The Supreme Court ruled in 2013 that there should only be one member of the JBC from Congress; the court left to Congress whom among the two would be its representative to the JBC.

The council is the only government body that has members from all three branches of the government, excluding ad hoc and advisory bodies.

Current membership
The members of the Judicial and Bar Council are:

 Ex officio secretary: Atty. Marife M. Lomibao- Cuevas, as Clerk of the Supreme Court en banc, since March 26, 2021
*Under the current arrangement, the congressman sits from January to June, while the senator sits from July to December. Only one representative is to sit at any time.

As a matter of tradition, the two most senior associate justices of the Supreme Court also take part in the JBC deliberations:
 Marvic Leonen (Senior Associate Justice)
 Alfredo Benjamin Caguioa (Associate Justice)

Function 

The function of the Council is to recommend to the representatives of possible appointees to the Judiciary.

The president shall choose from among those nominated, before the president may ask the Council to nominate somebody else and add it to the list, but this is not allowed anymore. In 2009, President Gloria Macapagal Arroyo asked the council to add more nominees on two Supreme Court vacancies. The council rejected the request. Arroyo then appointed someone from the list.

The person then chosen by the president then becomes a member of the Judiciary, and is not anymore reviewed by the Commission on Appointments. This is to prevent politicking and horse-trading among political parties.

Former Chief Justice Artemio Panganiban said that the Council's principal objective is to attract the best and brightest to the judiciary and to make them remain there.

Offices shortlisted 

 Justices of the Supreme Court
 Justices of the Court of Appeals
 Justices of the Sandiganbayan
 Justices of the Court of Tax Appeals
 Officials in the Office of the Ombudsman
 Members of the Legal Education Board
 Judges in the Regional Trial Courts and all lower courts

Members

The members of the JBC were:

Chief Justice

The Chief Justice became a member starting on December 10, 1987.

Secretaries of Justice
The Secretary of Justice became a member starting on December 10, 1987.

Representative from Congress
Congress is a bicameral legislature. The representative from Congress is either Chairman of the Senate Committee on Justice and Human Rights, or the House Committee on Justice.

One representative
Since the creation of the JBC in 1987 until 1994, the representation for Congress in the body alternated between the House of Representatives and the Senate.

Two representatives, half a vote each
By 1993, the two representatives from Congress began sitting simultaneously, each having one-half of a vote.

Two representatives, one vote each
On May 30, 2001, the JBC En Banc decided to grant the representatives from both Houses of Congress one full vote each.

One representative
In 2013, the eight-member composition of the JBC was questioned at the Supreme Court. The Supreme Court restored the composition of the JBC to seven. It was arranged that the representative of the House of Representatives sits from January to June, while the representative of the Senate sits from July to December.

Regular members

Notes

References

See also
Judicial nominating commission
Professional Regulation Commission

References
Chan Robles Virtual Law Library: Article 8

External links
Official website of the Judicial and Bar Council
Official Gazette of The Philippines JBC Brifer

Judiciary of the Philippines
Congress of the Philippines
Judicial nominations and appointments